Isophthalaldehyde is an organic compound with the formula C6H4(CHO)2. It is one of three isomers of benzene dicarbaldehyde, a reduced analog of phthalic acid.  It is colorless, although commercial samples often appear yellowish.  One preparation entails the Sommelet reaction of α,α'-diamino-ortho-xylene.

Reactions and use
Like many benzaldehydes, isophthalaldehyde forms a variety of Schiff base derivatives.  Being bifunctional (having two formyl groups), isophthalaldehyde allows the formation of polymers or covalent organic frameworks upon reaction with di- or triamines.

Other isomers
Isophthalaldehyde has two isomers: phthalaldehyde and terephthalaldehyde, for which the aldehyde groups are positioned on the 1 and 2 positions or 1 and 4 positions of the aromatic ring, respectively.

References

Benzaldehydes